Seven Feathers Event Center (formerly Compton Arena) is a 3,250-seat multi-purpose arena in Central Point, Oregon, United States, on the grounds of Jackson County Fairgrounds. It hosts local concerts and sporting events and was the home arena for the Southern Oregon Heat of the National Indoor Football League in 2001, affectionately called "The Inferno".

On July 3, 2015, it was announced that the Cow Creek Band of Umpqua Tribe of Indians had signed a three-year, $240,000 naming rights deal, naming the event center after its Seven Feathers Casino Resort in Canyonville.

References

External links 
 Jackson County Fairgrounds official website

Indoor arenas in Oregon
Central Point, Oregon
Sports in Jackson County, Oregon